The Executive Council of Gauteng is the cabinet of the executive branch of the provincial government in the South African province of Gauteng. The Members of the Executive Council (MECs) are appointed from among the members of the Gauteng Provincial Legislature by the Premier of Gauteng, an office held since October 2022 by Panyaza Lesufi.

Sexwale and Motshekga premierships: 1994–1999 
The first Premier of Gauteng, Tokyo Sexwale, was elected to office in the 1994 general election and appointed Gauteng's inaugural Executive Council. Premier Mathole Motshekga, who took office after Sexwale's resignation in 1998, largely preserved Sexwale's Executive Council.

Shilowa premiership

First term: 1999–2004 
In June 1999, pursuant to the 1999 general election, newly elected Premier Mbhazima Shilowa announced his new Executive Council, the composition of which was controversial in the provincial ANC – most of the members, for example, were members of the South African Communist Party.

Second term: 2004–2008 
On 29 April 2004, following the 2004 general election, the Gauteng Executive Council, still led by Shilowa, was sworn in to office. On 23 March 2006, Shilowa announced a minor reshuffle, appointing Kgaogelo Lekgoro as Social Development MEC – a position vacated by Bob Mabaso earlier that year amid a sexual harassment scandal – and replacing Health MEC Gwen Ramokgopa with Brian Hlongwa.

Mashatile premiership: 2008–2009 
Paul Mashatile was elected Premier in October 2008 when the incumbent Premier, Mbhazima Shilowa, resigned in order to defect from the governing African National Congress (ANC) to the opposition Congress of the People. Mashatile entirely preserved the composition of Shilowa's Executive Council, except that he appointed Mandla Nkomfe to replace himself as MEC for Finance and Economic Affairs.

Mokonyane premiership: 2009–2014 
On 8 May 2009, pursuant to the 2009 general election, newly elected Premier Nomvula Mokonyane announced the new Gauteng Executive Council. A month later, on 9 June, she announced that Nandi Mayathula-Khoza had been appointed MEC for Agriculture and Rural Development following the resignation of Nomantu Nkomo-Ralehoko.

On 2 November 2010, Mokonyane announced a major cabinet reshuffle, which she said she had devised "after consultations with the provincial leadership" of the ANC. However, it was widely believed that Mokonyane had been forced to make the changes by allies of former Premier Paul Mashatile, who had recently beaten Mokonyane in an election for the position of Provincial Chairperson of the Gauteng ANC. On 16 July 2012, Mokonyane announced another reshuffle, affecting four portfolios and occasioned by the resignation of Local Government and Housing MEC Humphrey Mmemezi. In August 2013, Eric Xayiya was appointed to replace Economic Development MEC Nkosiphendule Kolisile, who died in a car accident in July 2013.

Makhura premiership

First term: 2014–2019 
On 23 May 2014, pursuant to the 2014 general election, newly elected Premier David Makhura announced his new Executive Council. On 2 February 2016, he announced a reshuffle affecting three portfolios: Human Settlements, Social Development, and Infrastructure Development. In October 2015, he announced that Faith Mazibuko and Molebatsi Bopape would swap portfolios, with some adjustments to the portfolios themselves: Mazibuko became MEC for Sports, Heritage, Arts and Culture, and Bopape became MEC for Social Development.

In February 2017, Qedani Mahlangu resigned as Health MEC in the wake of the Life Esidimeni scandal, and Makhura appointed Gwen Ramokgopa to replace her. Finally, in March 2018, Uhuru Moiloa was appointed to the Executive Council to replace Paul Mashatile, who resigned to take up the full-time post of ANC Treasurer-General.

Second term: 2019–2022 

On 29 May 2019, following the 2019 general election, Makhura announced his new Executive Council, to be sworn in the following day. Not reflected in the table is the fact that Panyaza Lesufi was initially appointed MEC for Finance and E-Government and Nomantu Nkomo-Ralehoko was initially MEC for Education: Makhura reversed these appointments two days later, acquiescing in public calls for Lesufi to remain in the education portfolio (where he had been installed in 2014) and therefore appointing Nkomo-Ralehoko as MEC for Finance and E-Government. 

On 11 October 2019, Kgosientso Ramokgopa resigned as MEC for Economic Development, Agriculture and Environment and was replaced by Morakane Mosupyoe; on 19 June 2020, Nomathemba Mokgethi became MEC for Social Development, filling a vacancy left by Thuliswa Nkabinde-Khawe's death in November 2019. On 2 December 2020, Makhura announced a reshuffle affecting three portfolios – Economic Development, Social Development, and Health – after the former MEC for Health, Bandile Masuku, was fired amid a COVID-19 procurement scandal.

Lesufi premiership: 2022–present 
On 7 October 2022, the day after he replaced Premier David Makhura, Premier Panyaza Lesufi appointed a new Executive Council in which he retained seven of Makhura's MECs but transferred them to new portfolios. His Executive Council comprises himself and ten additional members.

See also 

 Template: Gauteng Executive Council
 Government of South Africa
 Constitution of South Africa
 Transvaal province

References 

Government of Gauteng